This is a list of flag bearers who have represented Brunei at the Olympics.

Flag bearers carry the national flag of their country at the opening ceremony of the Olympic Games.

See also
Brunei at the Olympics

References

Brunei at the Olympics
Brunei
Olympic